Kaliber may refer to:

 Kaliber (product), a low-alcohol pale lager from Guinness Brewery. See Guinness Brewery#Products
 Kaliber (band), Danish rap band
 Kaliber, a stage name used by Swedish DJ and producer John Dahlbäck
 Pepp & Kaliber, musical collaborative duo between John Dahlbäck and Jesper Dahlbäck
 Kaliber 44, Polish hip hop band

Others 
 X-Kaliber 2097, released as Sword Maniac in Japan, a Super NES action video game published by Activision
 Royal Kaliber, a horse that competed at the Grand Prix level of show jumping, and was part of the United States Show Jumping Team at the 2004 Athens Olympic Games
 3M-54 Kalibr, a family of Russian cruise missiles

See also 
 Caliber (disambiguation)